Peraceras is an extinct genus of rhinoceros endemic to North America.

Species
 Peraceras hessei Prothero & Manning 1987
 Peraceras profectum Matthew 1899
 Peraceras superciliosus Cope 1880

References

Miocene rhinoceroses
Tortonian extinctions
Miocene mammals of North America
Aquitanian genus first appearances
Taxa named by Edward Drinker Cope
Fossil taxa described in 1880